Christopher P. Sperry is a former American college baseball coach, formerly the head coach of the Portland Pilots baseball team from 1998 to 2015.

Sperry played four seasons at Portland as an infielder and catcher, earning All-Pac-10 honors in 1987 and helping the Pilots to the Conference Tournament title in 1989.  He played a single season in the Los Angeles Dodgers organization.  He later served as an assistant coach at A.C. Davis High School in Yakima, Washington from 1993 through 1995, while also assisting area American Legion Baseball teams.  Sperry became an assistant at Centralia, serving for two seasons, and was the head coach of the 1997 Oregon team at the Olympic Trials.  He earned a spot as top assistant at Portland State in September 1997, but left before seeing a game played to become head coach at Portland. He held the position for 18 seasons before the school fired him at the end of the 2015 season.

Head coaching record

References

External links

Living people
1965 births
Sportspeople from Vancouver, Washington
Centralia Trailblazers baseball coaches
High school baseball coaches in the United States
Portland Pilots baseball coaches
Salem Dodgers players